The Old Town Hall is a former, and the first, town hall in the German city of Hanover. Originally built in the old city district in 1410, replaced by the New Town Hall in 1913, and extensively restored in 1953 and 1964 after heavy bomb damage in World War II, it is the oldest secular building in the city. The market façade with the highly sophisticated Brick Gothic of the lucarnes has been preserved and partly restored in its medieval shape. Some elements of it were copied on other wings of the building.

History 
Prior to the construction of the town hall, the Council of the City of Hanover met in various places around the city. It is documented that between 1303 and 1410, the council met in the  city's theatre, in the market yard, and at the court arbour.

The first parts of the building were erected in 1410. After that, the building underwent several conversions and extensions. The original ground floor became today's basement due to late medieval contamination. According to the Hanover Chronicle, two new prisons were set up in the town hall in 1607.  In 1844, a renovation of the wings took place and the  apothecary wing, a half-timbered building from the 16th century, was demolished and replaced by a municipal court designed in the Italian Renaissance style by August Heinrich Andreae. Referred to as the Doge's Palace, it now houses the registry office.

When the old town hall was slated to be demolished at the end of the 19th century, a citizens' initiative was formed and the building was ultimately spared. The architect Conrad Wilhelm Hase oversaw a renovation of the building from 1877 to 1891, restoring it to the condition it was in when it was built, as it was considered a "pure" architectural style in the  Hanoverian school of architecture. The windows of the ground floor and the first floor had been rectangular at the time, but building photographs by Ludwig Droste in 1864 and von Hase in preparation for the renovation show that both floors on the north-west facade and the ground floor on the north-east facade originally had segmental arched windows. In the 1880s, the town hall complex received a new street front due to construction of the Karmarschstraße. At this time, Hase had a new wing added, in the neo-Gothic style. He was strongly guided by the medieval parts of the town hall.

The air raids on Hanover led to the partial destruction of the building complex in 1943, especially its oldest parts. Restorations took place in 1953 and in 1964 the show gable on the west side was reconstructed. As part of an extensive renovation in 1999, the courtyard was also redesigned and fitted with a glass roof.

Building usage 
After the construction of the building, the city council met in a ballroom on the first floor. Below this was a room on the ground floor in which imported goods were stored and which later served as a Ratskeller. This ground floor was later turned into a cellar. In 1863, the city administration left the Old Town Hall and moved into the Wangenheim Palace. It was not until 1913 that the New Town Hall, which was completed that year, became the seat of the city administration.

Around 1900, market women had their stands in the window bays of the former ground floor. Today, there are also restaurants and shops in the extended group of buildings of the Old Town Hall. A fatal accident in the building caused a stir on June 19, 2001, in which a small child was killed by a toppled statue in a restaurant.

General references

References

External links 

Buildings and structures in Hanover
City and town halls in Germany